Jeune Afrique (English: Young Africa) is a French-language pan-African weekly news magazine, founded in 1960 in Tunis and subsequently published in Paris by Jeune Afrique Media Group. It is the most widely read pan-African magazine. It offers coverage of African and international political, economic and cultural news. It is also a book publisher, under the imprint "Les Éditions du Jaguar".

Starting in 1997, Jeune Afrique has also maintained a news website.

Published on a weekly basis for its first sixty years, it has been published monthly since 2020.

History and profile
Jeune Afrique was co-founded by Béchir Ben Yahmed, then Minister of Information of Tunisian President Habib Bourguiba, and other Tunisian intellectuals in Tunis on 17 October 1960. The founders of the weekly moved to Paris due to strict censorship imposed during the presidency of Habib Bourgiba. The magazine covers African political, economic and cultural spheres, with an emphasis on Francophone Africa and the Maghreb.

From 2000 (issue 2040) to early 2006 (issue 2354), the magazine went by the name of Jeune Afrique L'intelligent.

Jeune Afrique is published by Jeune Afrique Media Group, which also publishes the monthly English-language news magazine The Africa Report.

The headquarters of the magazine in Paris has been attacked in France two times, once, in 1986, and the other time, in January 1987. Responsibility for the latter attack was claimed by the French nationalist Charles Martel Group.

The magazine has an edition published for Tunisia, which has been suspended several times for covering sensitive news concerning the country. For instance, from July 1984 to January 1985 it was banned in the country. In June 1989 the magazine was also banned in Morocco. During this period, it had a circulation of around 13,000 copies in the country.

The Covid-19 crisis and the print media situation in France has led to the ongoing digitalization of Jeune Afrique. In early December 2020, Jeune Afrique's management announced the first redundancy plan in its history due to declining economic results caused by the Covid-19 crisis.

Organization chart 
Amir Ben Yahmed, CEO

Danielle Ben Yahmed, Vice President

François Soudan, Vice President & Managing editor

Marwane Ben Yahmed, Director of publication

Mamadou Goundiam, Executive Director

References

External links

  
 Overview and circulation figures 

1960 establishments in Tunisia
French-language magazines
French-language mass media in Tunisia
News magazines published in France
Weekly magazines published in France
Magazines established in 1960
Magazines published in Paris
Magazines published in Tunisia
Africa-focused media